Rail Cargo Austria (RCA) is an Austrian rail freight transportation company with its headquarters in Vienna. It was founded on 1 January 2005 as an independent company from the freight transport division of the ÖBB Group.

RCA is one of three operative sub-companies of the holding company ÖBB-Holding AG. RCA serves as the leading operating company and manages the cross-border business of the Rail Cargo Group (RCG)

History and figures
The RCA was founded on 1 January 2005 as an independent freight transport company of the Austrian Federal Railways (ÖBB) and is one of three operative sub-companies of ÖBB-Holding AG. Rail Cargo Austria AG (RCA) unites the five business units Rail Cargo Logistics, Rail Cargo Operator, Rail Cargo Carrier, Rail Cargo Wagon and Maintenance (ÖBB-Technische Services) with the brand name Rail Cargo Group (RCG).

In 2016, the RCG generated with 8,400 employees, an annual turnover of 2.1 billion euros. It owns more than 50 operating companies; more than 30 of those are majority shareholdings. The RCG has offices in 18 countries. Their home markets are Austria and Hungary.

In 2008, the RCA bought the freight transport division of the Hungarian Railways (MÁV Cargo Rt.). The Rail Cargo Hungaria Zrt. (RCH) transports 135,000 trains and 32 million tons of goods annually.

On April 12, 2018, for the first time a direct freight train from Chengdu (China) ran over the 9,800-kilometer route (via Kazakhstan, Russia, Ukraine and Slovakia) to Vienna. As it is necessary to change between standard and wide gauge on this route, plans for the extension of the (Russian) wide gauge railway network up to the Vienna area have been running for several years - together with other railway companies. See Košice-Vienna broad gauge line.

Organization 
Rail Cargo Austria itself owns shares of other companies in the ÖBB Group as well as subsidiaries in the freight-forwarding sector.

The corporate group is subdivided into the following business areas:

Rail Cargo Logistics 
Rail Cargo Logistics - Austria GmbH was founded in 1947 as Express-Interfracht Internationale Spedition GmbH and has been part of Rail Cargo Austria AG since 1999.

The brand name Rail Cargo Logistics unites three companies since 2014 and is a full-service provider for intermodal rail freight forwarding of bulk goods.

The Rail Cargo Logistics includes:

 Rail Cargo Logistics - Austria GmbH: subsidiary for rail transport, MOBILER logistics - combination of rail and road, road transport and warehouse logistics
 Rail Cargo Logistics GmbH: subsidiary for transport logistics for bulk goods
 Rail Cargo Logistics - Environmental Services GmbH: logistics company in the field of waste recycling and waste disposal

Rail Cargo Operator 
Under the brand name Rail Cargo Operator, five Central and Eastern European operator companies of the RCG operate international intermodal transport services in the accompanied (ROLA - rolling highway) and unaccompanied combined transport.

The five companies include:

 Rail Cargo Operator - Austria GmbH (Austria)
 Rail Cargo Operator - CSKD s.r.o. (Czech Republic and Slovakia)
 Rail Cargo Operator - Hungaria Kft. (Hungary)
 Rail Cargo Terminal - BILK Zrt. (Hungary)
 Adria Kombi d.o.o. (Slovenia)

Rail Cargo Carrier 
Rail Cargo Carrier provides locomotives and employees and carries block trains to and from Central, Southern and Eastern Europe, as far as Russia or Turkey.

The Rail Cargo Carrier brand comprises the following companies:

 ÖBB Produktion GmbH
 Rail Cargo Hungaria Zrt.
 Rail Cargo Carrier Kft

Rail Cargo Wagon - Austria GmbH 
Rail Cargo Wagon - Austria GmbH was founded as part of the outsourcing of all freight wagons to its own company. It controls the wagon fleet of the Rail Cargo Group.

Technical Services 
This business unit summarizes the activities associated with maintenance and servicing. The brand Technical Services summarizes the following companies:

 ÖBB Technical Services GmbH
  Technical Services Hungaria Kft.
  TS-MAV Gépészet Services Kft.
  Technical Services Slovakia s.r.o.

References

External links
Rail Cargo Group
Rail Cargo Blog
Rail Cargo Hungaria
ÖBB

Railway companies of Austria
Austrian Federal Railways